William Welch may refer to:
 William C. Welch (born 1977), American professional wrestler for the CZW
 William Welch (cricketer, born 1907) (1907–1983), Australian cricketer
 William Welch (cricketer, born 1911) (1911–1940), Australian cricketer
 William Welch (printer), U.S. manufacturer
 William Welch II, former Chief of the Public Integrity Section of the DOJ Criminal Division
 William A. Welch (1868–1941), American engineer and environmentalist
 William H. Welch (1850–1934), founder of Johns Hopkins Medical School and instrumental reformer of medical education in the United States
 William Welsh (actor) (1870–1946), or William Welch, American actor
 William H. Welch (judge) (1805–1863), fourth and last Chief Justice of the Supreme Court of Minnesota Territory
 William H. Welch, known as Wilton Welch (born 1884) Australian actor, dramatist, director

 William Welch (designer) (born 1972), English industrial designer
 William W. Welch (1818–1892), member of the U.S. House of Representatives from Connecticut
 William Neville Welch (1906–1999), Church of England bishop

See also
 Bill Welch (1941–2009), U.S. politician and mayor
 William Welsh (disambiguation)